The 2022 Boucles de la Mayenne is the 47th edition of the Boucles de la Mayenne road cycling stage race, which took place between 26 and 29 May 2022 in the Mayenne department in northwestern France.

Teams 
Five UCI WorldTeams, twelve UCI ProTeams, and five UCI Continental teams made up the twenty-two teams that participated in the race.

UCI WorldTeams

 
 
 
 
 

UCI ProTeams

 
 
 
 
 
 
 
 
 
 
 
 

UCI Continental Teams

Route

Stages

Stage 1 
26 May 2022 – Saint-Pierre-des-Landes to Andouillé,

Stage 2 
27 May 2022 – Jublains to Pré-en-Pail-Saint-Samson,

Stage 3 
28 May 2022 – Saint-Berthevin to Château-Gontier-sur-Mayenne,

Stage 4 
29 May 2022 – Martigné-sur-Mayenne to Laval,

Classification leadership table 

 On stage 2, Bram Welten, who was second in the points classification, wore the green jersey, because first placed Jason Tesson wore the yellow jersey as leader of the general classification. For the same reason, Milan Fretin who was second in the young rider classification, wore the white jersey.
 On stage 3, Jason Tesson, who was second in the points classification, wore the green jersey, because first placed Benjamin Thomas wore the yellow jersey as leader of the general classification.

Final classification standings

General classification

Points classification

Mountains classification

Young rider classification

Team classification

References

Sources

External links
 

2022
Boucles de la Mayenne
Boucles de la Mayenne
Boucles de la Mayenne